Given to the Rising is the ninth studio album by American band Neurosis, released on June 5, 2007. The album is available in a standard jewel case, a limited-edition digipak, and a limited-edition double LP, all with the same track list. Decibel Magazine listed Given to the Rising as the 76th-best metal album of the decade. A DVD documentary is also available from Neurot Records. The artwork for the album, designed by Josh Graham, is a mixture of photos from Heroes Square in Budapest and drawings inspired by the place. Coincidentally, singer/guitarist Steve Von Till and Josh Graham had separately thought of the idea of using Heroes Square as the artwork for the album.

Musical style
The album has been described by music critics as a more aggressive, heavier album than their recent previous output, showcasing a "more direct and hard-hitting approach", resulting in "their heaviest record since 99's 'Times Of Grace'".

Critical reception

The album received critical acclaim upon release. In D. Shawn Bosler's review of the album for Pitchfork, he described it as "their best album in a decade." AllMusic's Thom Jurek praised it as "one hell of an album, better than anyone had any right to expect, and one of the high moments in a career filled with them. Neurosis have no need of caricatures or "more evil than thou" posturing. They are in a league of their own, and from the sounds of Given to the Rising, will remain there for some time."

Track listing

Personnel
Neurosis
 Scott Kelly – vocals, guitar
 Dave Edwardson – bass, backing vocals
 Jason Roeder – drums, percussions
 Steve Von Till – guitar, vocals
 Noah Landis – keyboards, synthesizers, effects, backing vocals

Technical personnel
 Steve Albini – production, mastering
 John Graham – artwork

Chart performance

References

2007 albums
Neurosis (band) albums
Neurot Recordings albums
Albums produced by Steve Albini